DAYDREAMER is a goal-based agent and cognitive architecture developed at University of California, Los Angeles by Erik Mueller. It models the human stream of thought and its triggering and direction by emotions, as in human daydreaming. The architecture is implemented as 12,000 lines of Lisp code.

History
DAYDREAMER was begun by Erik Mueller in 1983 while he was studying under Michael G. Dyer in the UCLA Computer Science Department. It was completed in 1987 and was followed by the ThoughtTreasure program, which was started in 1993.

See also
 Intelligent agent
 Interactive storytelling

References

Further reading
 Mueller, Erik T. (1990). Daydreaming in humans and machines. Norwood, NJ: Ablex. .
 Mueller, Erik T., & Dyer, Michael G. (1985). Towards a computational theory of human daydreaming. Proceedings of the Seventh Annual Conference of the Cognitive Science Society. Hillsdale, NJ: Lawrence Erlbaum.
 Mueller, Erik T., & Dyer, Michael G. (1985). "Daydreaming in humans and computers". Proceedings of the Ninth International Joint Conference on Artificial Intelligence. Los Altos, CA: Morgan Kaufmann.

External links
 DAYDREAMER code at GitHub
 DAYDREAMER code at CMU

Cognitive architecture
Common Lisp (programming language) software